The 1998–99 season of Segunda División B of Spanish football started in August 1998 and ended in May 1999 after the play-offs.

Summary before the 1998–99 season 
Playoffs de Ascenso:

 Cacereño 
 Real Madrid B
 Deportivo de La Coruña B
 Talavera
 Barakaldo
 Athletic Bilbao B 
 Beasain
 Cultural Leonesa
 Barcelona B (P) 
 Terrassa  
 Mallorca B (P) 
 Espanyol B
 Málaga (P) 
 Recreativo de Huelva (P) 
 Cádiz 
 Granada

Relegated from Segunda División:

 Elche
 Jaén
 Xerez
 Levante

Promoted from Tercera División:

 Lalín (from Group 1)
 Lealtad (from Group 2)
 Tropezón (from Group 3)
 Noja (from Group 3)
 Palamós (from Group 5)
 Benidorm (from Group 6)
 Móstoles (from Group 7)
 San Sebastián de los Reyes (from Group 7)
 Ceuta (from Group 10)
 Algeciras (from Group 10)
 Universidad de Las Palmas (from Group 12)
 Cartagonova (from Group 13)
 Águilas (from Group 13)
 Jerez (from Group 14)
 Calahorra (from Group 15)
 Binéfar (from Group 16)
 Conquense (from Group 17)

Relegated:

 As Pontes
 Rayo Majadahonda
 Carabanchel
 Leganés B
 Racing de Santander B
 Real Unión
 Izarra
 Andorra
 Gáldar
 Novelda
 Sóller
 FC Andorra
 Lorca
 San Pedro
 Guadix
 Mar Menor
 Zamora

Group I
Teams from Asturias, Canary Islands, Castilla–La Mancha, Community of Madrid and Galicia

Teams

League table

Results

Top goalscorers

Top goalkeepers

Group II
Teams from Aragon, Basque Country, Cantabria, Castile and León, Castilla–La Mancha, La Rioja and Navarre.

Teams

League Table

Results

Top goalscorers

Top goalkeepers

Group III
Teams from Catalonia, Region of Murcia and Valencian Community.

Teams

League Table

Results

Top goalscorers

Top goalkeepers

Group IV
Teams from Andalusia, Castilla–La Mancha, Ceuta, Extremadura and Melilla.

Teams

League Table

Results

Top goalscorers

Top goalkeepers

Play-offs

Group A

Group B

Group C

Group D

Play-out

Semifinal

Final

External links
Futbolme.com

Segunda División B seasons
3
Spain